Helen Wills Moody defeated Simonne Mathieu 7–5, 6–1 in the final to win the women's singles tennis title at the 1932 French Championships.

Seeds
The seeded players are listed below. Helen Moody is the champion; others show the round in which they were eliminated.

 Helen Moody (champion)
 Cilly Aussem (quarterfinals)
 Simonne Mathieu (finalist)
 Hilde Krahwinkel (semifinals)
 Eileen Fearnley Whittingstall (quarterfinals)
 Helen Jacobs (quarterfinals)
 Betty Nuthall (semifinals)
 Lilly De Alvarez (third round)

Draw

Key
 Q = Qualifier
 WC = Wild card
 LL = Lucky loser
 r = Retired

Finals

Earlier rounds

Section 1

Section 2

Section 3

Section 4

References

External links
 

1932 in women's tennis
1932
1932 in French women's sport
1932 in French tennis